Emil Friedrich August Walter (or Walther) Migula (born 1863 in Zyrowa, Prussia (present-day Poland); died 1938 in Eisenach, Germany) was a German botanist.

In 1890, he was habilitated for botany at Karlsruhe Institute of Technology, where he spent several years as a professor. At Karlsruhe, he also worked in the bacteriology department of the Food Research Institute. He was Professor of Botany at the research academy at Eisenach.

He published many articles on the subjects of cryptogamic botany, bacteriology, and plant physiology. He is remembered for describing the bacterial genus Pseudomonas, and for publication of Kryptogamen-Flora von Deutschland, Deutsch-Österreich und der Schweiz [Cryptogamic Flora of Germany, Austria, and Switzerland], a work connected with Otto Wilhelm Thomé's Flora von Deutschland [Plants of Germany]. Other significant works by Migula include:
 Die Bakterien, 1891 [Bacteria]
 System der Bakterien. Handbuch der Morphologie, Entwicklungsgeschichte und Systematik der Bakterien, 1897–1900. (two volumes) [System for bacteria. Handbook of morphology, developmental history and systematics of bacteria]
 Pflanzenbiologie, 1900 [Plant biology] 
 Morphologie, Anatomie und Physiologie der Pflanzen, 2nd edition 1906 Digital edition by the University and State Library Düsseldorf

References

External links

 http://www.chem-bio.uni-karlsruhe.de/19.php
 

20th-century German botanists
German microbiologists
German phycologists
1863 births
1938 deaths
Academic staff of the Karlsruhe Institute of Technology
19th-century German botanists